The Numagen River or Numugen River is a river in Madang Province, Papua New Guinea.

Numagen languages are spoken in the area.

See also
List of rivers of Papua New Guinea

References

Rivers of Papua New Guinea